Louis Laget (30 September 1821, Meyrueis - 28 November 1882) was a French republican politician. He was a member of the National Assembly from 1871 to 1876 and a Senator from 1876 to 1882.

References

1821 births
1882 deaths
People from Lozère
Politicians from Occitania (administrative region)
Republican Union (France) politicians
Members of the National Assembly (1871)
French Senators of the Third Republic
Senators of Gard